Michael Jeremiah "Jerry" Mahoney (December 19, 1860 - April 1, 1947) was a professional baseball umpire.

References

Further reading
 

1860 births
1947 deaths
Baseball people from Massachusetts
Major League Baseball umpires
19th-century baseball umpires
Sportspeople from Lowell, Massachusetts